Halloween 4: The Return of Michael Myers is a soundtrack by Alan Howarth for the film of the same name. It was released on September 28, 1988 through Varèse Sarabande. A limited expanded edition was released in 2011 through Alan Howarth Incorporated. It is the first Halloween soundtrack not to be produced by John Carpenter.

Track listing

Personnel
 Alan Howarth – composition, performance, production

References

1988 soundtrack albums
Horror film soundtracks
Film scores
Varèse Sarabande soundtracks
Halloween (franchise) soundtracks
Halloween albums